Cheng Fu (born 19 June 1946) is a Taiwanese gymnast. He competed in seven events at the 1968 Summer Olympics.

References

1946 births
Living people
Taiwanese male artistic gymnasts
Olympic gymnasts of Taiwan
Gymnasts at the 1968 Summer Olympics